Soap&Skin is the experimental musical project of Austrian artist Anja Plaschg (born 5 April 1990).

Life 
Anja Plaschg grew up in a small village called Poppendorf (near Gnas) in south east Styria, where her parents have a farm. She has played piano since she was six. At the age of 14 she began violin studies and developed an interest in electronic music. She attended the Graz Polytechnic for Graphic Design, but dropped out at 16 and moved to Vienna shortly afterwards. There she studied art at the Academy of Fine Arts in the master class of Daniel Richter, but at 18 dropped out again.

After only playing a handful of concerts she was already being dubbed a "Wunderkind". In 2008 she played German singer Nico in the play "Nico - Sphinx aus Eis" by Werner Fritsch in Berlin and Vienna, performing several songs in it, including "Janitor of Lunacy", from her first EP.

Her first album, called Lovetune for Vacuum, was released in March 2009. It received excellent reviews and placed in the Austrian Top 10. The album also achieved chart positions in Germany, Belgium, and France. Music journalists have already claimed to see in her a new star of Austrian pop.

Plaschg's father died in 2009 from a heart attack. During this time, Plaschg stated that she suffered "serious depression" for which she was hospitalized. The death influenced much of her second album, Narrow.

In 2010 she won a European Border Breakers Award for her international success.

Her tracks "Brother of Sleep" and "Marche Funèbre" were used in the soundtrack for Universal Pictures thriller War Games: At the End of the Day in 2010. Her track Wonder from the Narrow album was used in Belgium in the year 2019 as audio in the endgeneric of Dramafilm, All of Us produced by Willem Wallyn

In 2011 she created the song "Goodbye" together with Apparat. It was used in the final episode of the fourth season of Breaking Bad and later as the title song of the German Netflix-series Dark.

In 2012, she debuted as an actress, playing the role of the supporting character Carmen in the Austrian movie Stillleben (English title: Still Life). 
Two tracks, "Italy" and "Safe with Me" are used in the Italian film Sicilian Ghost Story (2017), written and directed by Fabio Grassadonia and Antonio Piazza.

Plaschg's third full album, From Gas to Solid / you are my friend, was released on 28 October 2018. A music video for "Heal", one of the tracks from the album, was released on 7 August 2018.

On September 14, 2021, Plaschg announced that she would be playing several concerts in 2022. The announcement contained a list of three shows, as well as a note from the artist stating that in the meantime she will be "diving down 300 years along [her] European ancestors exploring the arid surface of trees and roots of trauma, evil, pain."

Discography

Albums
 2009: Lovetune for Vacuum (Couch Records/PIAS Records) - Austria #5, Germany #47
 2012: Narrow (PIAS Records) - Austria #1, Germany #53
 2018: From Gas to Solid / You Are My Friend (PIAS Records) - Austria #3, Germany #68, Switzerland #82

EPs
 2008: Untitled (4-Track-EP) (Couch Records/PIAS Records)
 2009: Marche Funèbre (3-Track-EP) (Couch Records/PIAS Records)
 2013: Sugarbread (3-Track-EP) (PIAS Records)

Singles
 2009: Spiracle (7" Vinyl) (Couch Records/PIAS Records) - Austria #45
 2009: Mr. Gaunt PT 1000 (Couch Records/PIAS Records) - Austria #60
 2009: Cynthia (Couch Records)
 2012: Voyage Voyage (SOLFO Music)
 2015: Mawal Jamar (SOLFO Music)
 2018: Heal (PIAS Records)
 2018: Italy (PIAS Records)
 2018: Surrounded (PIAS Records)
 2019: Safe With Me - Instrumental (PIAS Records)
 2019: Surrounded (Planningtorock Remix) (PIAS Records)
 2019: Drag Shift (Denovali Records)
 2020: What's Up? (PIAS Recordings Germany)

Filmography
 2012: Stillleben (Still Life), as Carmen
 2016: Die Geträumten (The Dreamed Ones), as Ingeborg Bachmann

References

External links

 
 Solfo Music
 Review of 'Narrow' on BBC Music

1990 births
Living people
21st-century Austrian women singers
English-language singers from Austria
PIAS Recordings artists